6-Fluoro-α-methyltryptamine (6-fluoro-AMT, 6F-AMT) is a tryptamine derivative related to compounds such as alpha-methyltryptamine and 5-MeO-AMT, which has been sold as a designer drug. Animal tests showed it to be somewhat less active than AMT or 5-fluoro-AMT, but it was nevertheless allegedly manufactured and sold from the laboratory operated by Leonard Pickard and Gordon Todd Skinner, who described 6-fluoro-AMT as "a beast".

In interviews, Skinner stated that he first began to experiment with 6-fluoro-AMT in the early 1980s by giving it to high school friends. Their experiences made him cautious about the appropriate dosage amounts, which he says ranges from 25mg to 75mg [Skinner weighed about 250lbs at the time of his own bioassay]. Skinner said that it is a long-lasting psychedelic with significantly more time distortion, and felt the drug was enhanced by combining it with ALD-52.

See also 
 5-Fluoro-AET
 6-Fluoro-DMT
 6-Fluoro-DET
 7-Chloro-AMT
 O-4310

References 

Tryptamines
Fluoroarenes